Malmö Allmänna Idrottsförening, also known simply as Malmö AI or MAI, are a Swedish athletics club based in Malmö. The club are affiliated with Svenska Friidrottsförbundet. The club's outdoor training and events are held at Malmö Stadion while indoor training and events are held at Atleticum. The club's colours are black, white and green which is reflected in their logo and kit. The club were formed on 7 September 1908.

References

External links
 Malmö Allmänna Idrottsförening

Athletics clubs in Sweden
Multi-sport clubs in Sweden
Sport in Malmö
Sports clubs established in 1908
Badminton clubs in Sweden
Badminton in Sweden
1908 establishments in Sweden